Asad bey Amirov (1889, Shusha- 1939, Baku) was a Member of the Parliament of the Azerbaijan Democratic Republic and the Ittihad Faction.

Life 
Asad bey Amirov was born in 1889 in Shusha. He is a graduate of the Transcaucasian Teachers' Seminary.

Amirov was elected a member of the Parliament of the Azerbaijan Democratic Republic on April 24, 1919 as a member of the Ittihad Party. Amirov was a member of the Ittihad faction in the parliament. He was also a member of the Baku City Public Office.

Amirov was a member of the Ittihad Party. On April 10, 1919, the first congress of the Ittihad Party was held. 300 congress representatives were invited to the congress held in the building of the Baku City Office. At the congress, Amirov was elected a member of the 22-member Central Committee of the Ittihad Party.

On January 25, 1920, at 1 o'clock, the Second Congress of the Ittihad Party was held in the hall of the Baku Public Assembly. A total of 1,000 congress delegates attended the congress. At the 4-day congress, Amirov was directly elected a member of the Central Committee as a member of parliament.

In April 1920, the Azerbaijan Democratic Republic was occupied by the Bolsheviks. Shortly afterwards, all political parties ceased to exist.

See also 
 Ittihad

References

Footnotes

Source 
 
 
 

 
 

People from Shusha
1889 births
1939 deaths
Azerbaijan Democratic Republic politicians
Members of the National Assembly of the Azerbaijan Democratic Republic
Transcaucasian Teachers Seminary alumni